This is a list of social activities at the University of Durham, including details of clubs, societies and other common leisure activities associated with Durham University. Over 200 student clubs and organisations run within Durham Students' Union.

Sports

General 
 College Varsity, a sporting competition between college teams from Durham University and the University of York held alternately at York and Durham in the Lent term since 2014.
 Doxbridge Tournament, an unofficial sporting competition held annually since 1999 at the start of the Easter holiday between college teams from Durham University, the University of Oxford, the University of Cambridge and (since 2011) the University of York.
 Durham University Athletic Union, a student-run organisation responsible for sport at Durham University. In 2006, the Athletic Union was rebranded "Team Durham" to signify a more modern approach to sport at Durham. In contrast to most British universities, it is a separate organisation with the status of a students' union, rather than a part of Durham Students' Union, the primary student representative body at Durham University.
 There are many college sports teams which allow for participation in sport at a less intense level than the university sports teams. There are leagues or tournaments between colleges in most major sports, with many colleges having multiple teams covering a wide range of ability levels. This is a contributing factor to the high participation in sport at the university.

Clubs 
 Association football:
 DUAFC
 Rugby union:
 Durham University Rugby Football Club, previous members have included England captains Phil de Glanville and Will Carling.
 Quidditch:
 Durhamstrang

Rowing 
 Durham University Boat Club 
 Boat Race of the North
 Durham Regatta
Novice Cup This was known as the Hatfield cup until 2003 when Durham College Rowing took over the organising of the event.
Senate Cup
Pennant Series
Admirals Regatta

College boat clubs

Student unions 
Durham has a central students' union as well as junior common rooms (or equivalent) in each college.

 Durham Students' Union, the Durham-wide federal union

Durham Union Society 
The Durham Union Society (DUS), commonly referred to as the Durham Union, is a debating society, founded in 1842, by the students of the University of Durham, which then comprised only University College, and Hatfield Hall.[1] Commonly referred to as the Union, or the DUS, it is the University's largest society, with over 3,000 members in residence, and 24,000 worldwide. Until 1899, when the Durham Students' Union's ancestor was founded, the society acted as the University's students' union./>

History 
The Union was founded in 1842. It was the last student debating union founded along the lines of those that had been established at Cambridge in 1815 and at Oxford in 1823. Intended both as clubs and debating societies, they provided additional comforts like reading rooms, dining facilities, billiards, and libraries. The first debates were held in the reading rooms of Hatfield Hall and University College. In 1872 the Society moved to what is now the Palace Green library, where the University's first purpose-built debating chamber was established. The Union predates the 1899 founding of the Students' Representatives Council (SRC). Consequently, there exists in Durham, like that of Oxford and Cambridge, the anomaly of both a union society and a students' union.

Because Durham University did not enjoy the wealth or the influence of the alumni of its southern counterparts, its Union Society did not flourish in the same way as the Union Societies of Oxford and Cambridge. So poor were the facilities of the Durham Union that by Easter 1896 no debates could be held. That same year the University offered the Union a financial lifeline, by which the latter would be reconstituted as a centrally funded students' union like those being established at the newer Red brick universities. This was rejected by the members however, who opted to stick with the Cambridge model and embarked on a 'precarious path of independence' that has often led it to be 'marginalised' within the wider priorities of Durham University. The university authorities pressed on with the formation of a SRC regardless, and ignored calls from the Union to be given additional facilities, which would not be received until 1936. Independence ensured a state of relative poverty that did not work to the advantage of the DUS. Bertie Dockerill, an academic who has written on the history of student debating societies, emphasises that continued use of Union facilities:

has remained dependent upon the University believing that they were necessary, a system of landlordism that has not served the DUS well. The Union has been forcibly removed from its original home upon the library side of Palace Green that it had been gifted by the Warden of the University in 1873 (it now houses a lavatory complex), had its artwork appropriated, its coffee shop and dining room confiscated, and enjoys neither a library nor sole usage of its debating chamber, the latter commandeered daily by the University for lectures

In the final years of the nineteenth century debates often revolved around ecclesiastical matters, a reflection not just of the student intake (which included high numbers of young men preparing for holy orders) but Durham's traditional curriculum of the university and the 'stranglehold' that the Dean and Chapter of Durham exercised over the university – with the few political debates tending to concern the then contentious issue of Irish Home Rule. A few of the debate subjects were tongue-in-cheek, such as an 1887 motion 'That in the opinion of this House the Fair Sex is the root of all evil' – a proposal eventually defeated by a large majority. The first 'Ladies night', where female students were able to participate, was held in 1895. In 1900, as the Boer War raged, members sent a telegram congratulating Messrs. Tuckey and Macpherson – both former Durham Union men who had been trapped in the city of Ladysmith as it came under siege from Boer forces – on finally being relieved, and soon received a reply from the pair of them.

The turn of the century saw more political debates, with society members almost invariably siding with the positions of the Conservative Party, while those of the Liberals were roundly rejected by majorities in excess of 70% at each of three debates in 1905, 1907, and 1911. The third administration of Lord Salisbury attained a vote of confidence in excess of 90%. Opinions on immigration were not consistent. While members applauded the robust views of Hatfield student and future Bishop of Bangor D.E. Davies, who suggested immigrants were predominantly 'disease-ridden criminals' that would 'have to be supported by public money', they rejected in the following term the motion that ‘the introduction of yellow and black races into western lands removes white man’s comforts’ by a ratio of around five to one.

To mark the 70th anniversary of the Durham Union, an inter-varsity debate chaired by then President J. E. T. Philipps, was held on Saturday 16 March 1912 at the Great Hall of University College, and featured visiting teams from Oxford, Cambridge, Trinity College, Dublin, and Edinburgh University – with the burning issue of Irish Home Rule as the subject of discussion. This was something of a reunion for three of the participants: Philipps, F. K. Griffith (President of the Oxford Union), and H. Grose–Hodge (from the Cambridge Union) were all schoolmates in the same form at Marlborough College.

To get around the limitations of its premises, the society traded its ownership of 44 North Bailey opposite Hatfield College for the old site of St Aidan's Society at 24 North Bailey, which allowed the creation of a social club (named the 'North Bailey Club' or, more informally '24'). This contains a bar which is open to all Durham Union members; a snooker room; a reading room that the Durham Union uses for functions, such as post debate entertaining, and an en-suite guest room that can be hired out by members. Student members also have the opportunity to rent bedrooms as student accommodation.

In 1977 the Union was obliged to move across Palace Green to a purpose-built debating chamber in the Pemberton Buildings, which sit in the shadow of Durham Cathedral.

The Union today

The Durham Union still maintains its offices and debating chamber on the Palace Green World Heritage Site, as well as 24 North Bailey. It hosts weekly debates featuring prominent external speakers, as well as inviting address speakers and holding social events.

The Union also excelled at competitive debating, until its debating branch disaffiliated in 2021. Having won the European Universities Debating Championship in 2005, and more recently having teams reaching the final of the European Championship, Oxford IV, Cambridge IV and John Smith Memorial Mace and the quarter-final of the World Universities Debating Championship. It also hosted the prestigious Durham Intervarsity competition, the Durham Open and Durham Schools; the world's largest residential school's debating competition.

The social highlight of the year is the annual Ball held in Michaelmas term. The programme for the evening varies, but usually consists of a champagne reception, dinner, music, and after dinner dancing. The Union also holds members only socials, with recent events including a 'Halloween Social', 'American Election Social', 'Chinese New Year Social' and 'Valentines Social'.

Lord Adonis has cited his and Anna Soubry's 105-82 victory at a Durham Union Brexit debate as evidence that students are turning against Britain's decision to leave the European Union. Upon winning a debate at the Durham Union, Spectator columnist James Delingpole wrote that "For a real Oxbridge education, you now have to go to Durham"

NUS incident
In 2010, the Union was forced to cancel a debate on multiculturalism on safety grounds, after the National Union of Students' Black Students Officer Bellavia Ribeiro-Addy and LGBT Officer Daf Adley sent a letter to the Union, Durham University and Durham Students Union. The letter opposed the invitation of then BNP MEP Andrew Brons, and warned of a “colossal demonstration” if the debate went ahead. It went on to say “If any students are hurt in and around this event, responsibility will lie with you.”

The cancellation of the debate by Union President Anna Birley on safety grounds was met with fierce backlash. NUS President Wes Streeting was prompted to personally appear before the Durham Union to apologise for the actions of the officers concerned, though outrage among Durham students was sufficient that a significant number protested outside the debating chamber at the time. An anti-censorship protest group on Facebook quickly amassed over 2,500 members. An official petition was lodged with Durham Students' Union to call for a referendum on disaffiliation from NUS. On 12 March 2010, the referendum concluded with a majority of voting students choosing to disaffiliate. In 2011 the Durham Students' Union held a further referendum, whereby students taking part in the referendum voted to reaffiliate with the NUS.

Chinese Embassy incident
In 2017, the Chinese Embassy attempted to block supermodel and activist Anastasia Lin from speaking in a debate. An official at the embassy warned the Union that the debate, which also featured former Foreign Secretary Sir Malcolm Rifkind, could damage relations between the UK and China. Union President Tom Harwood insisted that "Everyone has been very polite," and the debate went ahead as planned.

Tommy Robinson incident
In 2015, the Union cancelled a speech from Tommy Robinson, reportedly after pressure from the University.

Durham Debating Split and Reaffiliation
As a result of a December 2020 members' referendum, Durham Union Debating, the student competitive debate wing of the Durham Union, voted to leave the wider Durham Union Society, and affiliate with the Durham Students' Union as the now-independent Durham Debating Society. In June 2022, the Durham Debating Society voted to reaffiliate with the Durham Union Society, and as a result left the Durham Students' Union, reversing the decision made a year and half before.

Reciprocal relations
The Union's members enjoy reciprocal relations with, and use of facilities at, the Oxford Union, Cambridge Union, The Hist, Olivaint Conference of Belgium and The Phil, both of Trinity College Dublin.

Notable members
Mo Mowlam MP (Past Secretary, Labour Minister of State, most famous for her work on the Good Friday Agreement)
Crispin Blunt MP (Past President, Conservative MP for Reigate & Minister of State)
General Sir Richard Dannatt (Past President, former Chief of the General Staff)
Mark Elliott (Past President, author of several books on Azerbaijan and travel in Asia)
Edward Leigh MP (Past President, Conservative MP for Gainsborough and former Chairman of the Public Accounts Committee)
Gabby Logan (Past Assistant Sponsorship Secretary, BBC sports presenter & contestant on BBC1's Strictly Come Dancing 2007)
Giles Ramsay (Past President, Founding Artistic Director of the Trident Theatre)
Dianne Hayter (Past Member, Former General Secretary of the Fabian Society)
The Rt Revd Richard Blackburn (Former President; currently Bishop of Warrington in the Church of England)
Robert Buckland (Past President, Conservative MP for Swindon South & Solicitor General for England and Wales)
Tracy Philipps (Past President, Commissioner in Colonial Service and conservationist)
Tom Harwood (Past President, Journalist for Guido Fawkes and GB News)

Academic societies 
 Arthur Holmes Geological Society
 Durham Astronomical Society
 Durham Spaceflight 
 Durham University Accounting and Finance Society
 Durham University Anthropology Society
 Durham University Archaeology Society
 Durham University Biological Society
 Durham University Business Society
 Durham University Business Psychology Society
 Durham University Chemistry Society
 Durham University Classics Society
 Durham University Combined Honours Social Society
 Durham University Computing Society
 Durham University Economics Society
 Durham University Education Society
 Durham University Engineering Society
 Durham University English Literature Society
 Durham University Finance Society
 Durham University French Society
 Durham University Geographical Society
 Durham University German Language and Cultures Society
 Durham University History Society
 Durham University Law Society
 Durham University Philosophy, Politics and Economics (PPE) Society
 Durham University Marketing Society
 Durham University Mathematical Society
 Durham University Medical Society
 Durham University Natural Science Society
 Durham University Women in STEM
 Durham University Philosophy Society
 Durham University Psychology Society
 Durham University Palaeontological Society
 Durham Physics Society
 Durham University Politics and International Relations Society
 Durham ELSA
 Durham University Society of Applied Social Science
 Durham University Sustainable Finance Society
 Durham University Theology Society
 Durham University Chemical Society
 Geology for Global Development (Durham Group)

Drama societies

Durham Student Theatre
Durham Student Theatre (DST, formerly Durham University Student Theatre, DUST) is a student-run organisation responsible for theatre at Durham University, with performances put on every week of term at the Assembly Rooms Theatre.

DST acts as an umbrella organisation for the many theatre companies based at the university, such as Durham University Light Opera Group (DULOG). There are also numerous college based theatre groups, run by the Junior Common Room of the individual colleges, some of which are college members only, with others being open to all.

Durham Revue 
The Durham Revue is an established sketch comedy group. In 1974, four students founded 'DUST' (Durham University Sensible Thespians), which initially produced comedy revue shows exclusively for Durham student audiences. However, in 1977, under the presidency of Arthur Bostrom, DUST took their first show to the Edinburgh Fringe Festival. This inaugural Fringe show included John Inge (Bishop of Worcester) and Jennie Campbell (former BBC comedy producer). The group changed its name to the 'Durham Revue' in 1988.

Its members write and perform all material themselves and shows are put on annually at the Assembly Rooms Theatre, and the professional Gala Theatre where they perform alongside the Cambridge Footlights and the Oxford Revue. The Durham Revue also travels yearly to Cambridge, Oxford, and the Edinburgh Fringe where they perform for the full run of the festival.

The Durham Revue membership generally consists of six writers and performers. Membership is based upon audition and interview, and these take place just once a year during Michaelmas Term. Former members include Jeremy Vine, Nish Kumar, Ed Gamble, and Alex Macqueen.

Music Durham 
Music Durham (formerly Durham University Music Society, DUMS) is a student-run organisation responsible for the majority of student music activities at Durham University. Performances take place in university venues such as the Great Hall of Durham Castle, the Mark Hillery Arts Centre in Collingwood College and the Margot Fonteyn ballroom in Durham Students' Union, as well as external venues such as Durham Cathedral, Durham Town Hall, the Gala Theatre and Sage Gateshead.

Music Durham is an umbrella organisation for the many ensembles based at the university. It currently consists of 28 university ensembles, including the Orchestral Society (DUOS), Palatinate Orchestra (DUPO), Choral Society, Big Band, Chamber Choir, concert band, brass band and gamelan. There are also many college music groups, including chapel choirs, chamber ensembles and function bands which perform at college events.

Miscellaneous societies 
 Purple Radio, the student radio station
 Palatinate, Durham's independent student-run fortnightly newspaper, has been continually published since 1948
 Mostly Harmless, student satirical publication
 The Grove, student literary publication
Durham Inter-Collegiate Christian Union, the university's most prominent student Christian organisation, founded in 1931

Leisure activities 
 Formal Hall, a formal dinner in a college

Notes

References

External links 
 Durham University Students Union
 Durham Union Society

Student debating societies
1842 establishments in England
Social activities
List of social activities
Durham